The 2012 South Carolina Gamecocks baseball team represented the University of South Carolina in the 2012 NCAA Division I baseball season.  The Gamecocks played their home games in Carolina Stadium. The team was coached by Ray Tanner, who was in his sixteenth season at Carolina.

Personnel

Roster

2012 South Carolina Gamecocks Baseball Roster & Bios http://gamecocksonline.cstv.com/sports/m-basebl/mtt/scar-m-basebl-mtt.html

Coaching staff

2012 South Carolina Gamecocks Baseball Coaches & Bios http://gamecocksonline.cstv.com/sports/m-basebl/mtt/scar-m-basebl-mtt.html#coaches

Schedule

! style="background:#73000A;color:white;"| Regular Season
|- valign="top" 

|- bgcolor="#ccffcc"
| 1 || February 17 ||  || Carolina Stadium || 2–1 || Webb (1–0) || Watts (0–1) || Koumas (1) || 8,242 || 1–0 || –
|- bgcolor="#ccffcc"
| 2 || February 18 || VMI || Carolina Stadium || 3–2 || Carter (1–0) || Garrett (0–1) || None || 7,675 || 2–0 ||–
|- bgcolor="#ccffcc"
| 3 || February 18 || VMI || Carolina Stadium || 13–1 || Holmes (1–0) || Brown (0–1) || None || 7,336 || 3–0 || –
|- bgcolor="#ccffcc"
| 4 || February 24 ||  || Carolina Stadium || 8–1 || Roth (1–0) || Webb (1–1) || None || 6,618 || 4–0 ||–
|- bgcolor="#ccffcc"
| 5 || February 25 || Elon || Carolina Stadium || 3-2 || Price (1-0) || Clark (1-1) || Koumas (2) || 7,606 || 5–0 ||–
|- bgcolor="#ccffcc"
| 6 || February 26 || Elon || Carolina Stadium || 6-0 || Holmes (2-0) || Whitehead (0-1) || None || 7,304 || 6–0 ||–
|- bgcolor="#ccffcc"
| 7 || February 28 ||  || Carolina Stadium || 2-1 || Belcher (1-0) || Dees (0-1) || Webb (1) || 6,521 || 7–0 ||–
|-

|- bgcolor="#ccffcc"
| 8 || March 2 || vs. Clemson || Joe Riley Park || 3-211 || Koumas (1-0) || Gossett (0-1) || Belcher (1) || 5,851 || 8–0 ||–
|- bgcolor="#ccffcc"
| 9 || March 3 || Clemson || Carolina Stadium || 9-6 || Beal (1-0) || Leone (2-1) || Belcher (2) || 8,242 || 9–0 ||–
|- align="center" bgcolor="#ffbbb"
| 10 || March 4 || @Clemson || Doug Kingsmore Stadium || 5-6 || Firth (1-0) || Koumas (1-1) || None || 6,039 || 9–1 ||–
|- bgcolor="#ccffcc"
| 11 || March 7 ||  || Carolina Stadium || 8-1 || Seddon (1-0) || Roland (2-2) || None || 6,403 || 10–1 ||–
|- bgcolor="#ccffcc"
| 12 || March 9 ||  || Carolina Stadium || 2-1 || Roth (2-0) || Hermans (1-1) || Beal (1) || 6,813 || 11–1 ||–
|- bgcolor="#ccffcc"
| 13 || March 10 || Princeton || Carolina Stadium || 6-1 || Price (2-0) || Ford (0-2) || Koumas (3) || 7,426 || 12–1 ||–
|- bgcolor="#ccffcc"
| 14 || March 11 || Princeton || Carolina Stadium || 3-1 || Holmes (3-0) || Bowman (1-1) || Beal (2) || 7,122 || 13–1 ||–
|- bgcolor="#ccffcc"
| 15 || March 13 ||  || Carolina Stadium || 5-2 || Westmoreland (1-0) || Buran (0-2) || Seddon (1) || 6,836 || 14–1 ||–
|- bgcolor="#ccffcc"
| 16 || March 14 ||  || Carolina Stadium || 6-4 || Webb (2-0) || Farmer (1-1) || Beal (3) || 7,278 || 15–1 ||–
|- align="center" bgcolor="#ffbbb"
| 17 || March 16 || @Kentucky || Cliff Hagan Stadium || 3-4 || Peterson (2-0) || Beal (1-1) || None || 2,032 || 15–2 ||0–1
|- align="center" bgcolor="#ffbbb"
| 18 || March 17 || @Kentucky || Cliff Hagan Stadium || 3-4 || Reed (4-0) || Price (2-1) || Gott (4) || 1,950 || 15–3 || 0–2
|- align="center" bgcolor="#ffbbb"
| 19 || March 18 || @Kentucky || Cliff Hagan Stadium || 3-6 || Wijas (2-0) || Belcher (1-1) || Gott (5) || 2,571 || 15–4 || 0–3
|- bgcolor="#ccffcc"
| 20 || March 20 || @ || Fluor Field || 8-5 || Privette (1-0) || Wood (3-2) || Beal (4) || 5,965 || 16–4 ||–
|- align="center" bgcolor="#ffbbb"
| 21 || March 21 ||  || Carolina Stadium || 4-511 || Eck (3-1) || Beal (1-2) || None || 6,923 || 16–5 ||–
|- bgcolor="#ccffcc"
| 22 || March 22 || Florida || Carolina Stadium || 9-3 || Price (3-1) || Rodriguez (3-1) || None || 8,242 || 17–5 || 1–3
|- align="center" bgcolor="#ffbbb"
| 23 || March 23 || Florida || Carolina Stadium || 2-8 || Johnson (4-0) || Koumas (1-2) || None || 8,242 || 17–6 || 1–4
|- align="center" bgcolor="#ffbbb"
| 24 || March 24 || Florida || Carolina Stadium || 4-5 || Maddox (2-0) || Price (3-2) || None || 8,242 || 17–7 || 1–5
|- bgcolor="#ccffcc"
| 25 || March 27 || @The Citadel || Joe Riley Park || 7-3 || Montgomery (1-0) || Tompkins (0-1) || None || 4,417 || 18–7 ||–
|- bgcolor="#ccffcc"
| 26 || March 30 || @ || Hawkins Field || 8-3 || Roth (3-0) || Ziomek (2-4) || Price (1) || 2,525 || 19–7 || 2–5
|- align="center" bgcolor="#ffbbb"
| 27 || March 31 || @Vanderbilt || Hawkins Field || 4-12 || Beede (1-3) || Beal (1-3) || Miller (2) || 3,113 || 19–8 || 2–6
|-

|- bgcolor="#ccffcc"
| 28 || April 1 || @ || Hawkins Field || 6-413 || Montgomery (2-0) || Pfeifer (0-1) || None || 2,851 || 20–8 || 3–6
|- bgcolor="#ccffcc"
| 29 || April 4 || @ || Patriot's Point|| 7-0 || Westmoreland (2-0) || West (2-3) || None || 1,767 || 21–8 ||–
|- align="center" bgcolor="#ffbbb"
| 30 || April 6 ||  || Carolina Stadium || 4-5 || Steckenrider (3-2) || Price (3-3) || Blount (8) || 8,242 || 21–9 || 3–7
|- bgcolor="#ccffcc"
| 31 || April 7 || Tennessee || Carolina Stadium || 2-1 || Webb (3-0) || Watson (3-1)|| None || 7,448 || 22–9 || 4–7
|- bgcolor="#ccffcc"
| 32 || April 8 || Tennessee || Carolina Stadium || 6-1 || Holmes (4-0) || Williams (2-3) || Beal (5) || 6,981 || 23–9 || 5–7
|- bgcolor="#ccffcc"
| 33 || April 10 || The Citadel || Carolina Stadium || 8-0 || Belcher (2-1) || Clarkson (1-3) || None || 7,129 || 24–9 ||–
|- align="center" bgcolor="#ffbbb"
| 34 || April 11 || @ || Clifford Cormell Field || 4-5 || Broderick (6-1) || Westmoreland (2-1) || Stoner (2) || 1,755 || 24–10 ||–
|- bgcolor="#ccffcc"
| 35 || April 13 || Mississippi State || Carolina Stadium || 7-6 || Beal (2-3) || Reed (0-5) || Price (2) || 8,105 || 25–10 || 6–7
|- bgcolor="#ccffcc"
| 36 || April 14 || Mississippi State || Carolina Stadium || 5-3 || Montgomery (3-0) || Graveman (2-2) || Price (3) || 8,242 || 26–10 || 7–7
|- bgcolor="#ccffcc"
| 37 || April 15 || Mississippi State || Carolina Stadium || 6-4 || Holmes (5-0) || Mitchell (1-1) || Webb (2) || 7,011 || 27–10 || 8–7
|- align="center" bgcolor="#ffbbb"
| 38 || April 17 || College of Charleston || Carolina Stadium || 3-4 || West (4-3) || Belcher (2-2) || Peterson (9) || 6,913 || 27–11 ||–
|- bgcolor="#ccffcc"
| 39 || April 20 || @ || Plainsman Park || 12-5 || Roth (4-0) || Varnadore (1-6) || None || 2,949 || 28–11 || 9–7
|- bgcolor="#ccffcc"
| 40 || April 21 || @Auburn || Plainsman Park || 5-3 || Montgomery (4-0) || Jacobs (5-1) || Price (4) || 3,701 || 29–11 || 10–7
|- bgcolor="#ccffcc"
| 41 || April 22 || @Auburn || Plainsman Park || 11-7 || Holmes (6-0) || Koger (2-4) || None || 2,747 || 30–11 || 11–7
|- bgcolor="#bbbbbb"
| - || April 26 || Alabama || Carolina Stadium || colspan=7 |Suspended
|- bgcolor="#ccffcc"
| 42 || April 27 || Alabama || Carolina Stadium || 1-0 || Webb (4-0) || Keller (1-3) || Price (5) || 7,403 || 31–11 || 12–7
|- bgcolor="#ccffcc"
| 43 || April 27 || Alabama || Carolina Stadium || 12-11 || Belcher (3-2) || Keller (1-4) || None || 8,242 || 32–11 || 13–7
|- bgcolor="#ccffcc"
| 44 || April 28 || Alabama || Carolina Stadium || 9-1 || Belcher (4-2) || Kamplain (1-4) || None || 8,242 || 33–11 || 14–7
|-

|- bgcolor="#ccffcc"
| 45 || May 2 ||  || Carolina Stadium || 2-1 || Koumas (2-2) || Russell (4-5) || Price (6) || 7,177 || 34–11 ||–
|- bgcolor="#ccffcc"
| 46 || May 4 || @Arkansas || Baum Stadium || 8-610 || Beal (3-3) || Astin (2-4) || Price (7) || 8,982 || 35–11 || 15–7
|- align="center" bgcolor="#ffbbb"
| 47 || May 5 || @Arkansas || Baum Stadium || 6-7 || Wright (1-0) || Montgomery (4-1) || Astin (9) || 8,774 || 35–12 || 15–8
|- bgcolor="#ccffcc"
| 48 || May 6 || @Arkansas || Baum Stadium || 10-7 || Price (4-3) || Baxendale (6-3) || None || 8,461 || 36–12 || 16–8
|- bgcolor="#ccffcc"
| 49 || May 9 ||  || Carolina Stadium || 7-0 || Seddon (2-0) || Carlson (1-5) || None || 6,774 || 37–12 ||–
|- bgcolor="#ccffcc"
| 50 || May 11 || @ || Foley Field || 3-0 || Roth (5-0) || Wood (6-2) || Price (8) || 2,744 || 38–12 || 17–8
|- align="center" bgcolor="#ffbbb"
| 51 || May 12 || @Georgia || Foley Field || 5-6 || Nagel (1-1) || Price (4-4) || None || 2,686 || 38–13 || 17–9
|- bgcolor="#bbbbbb"
| – || May 13 || @Georgia || Foley Field || colspan=7 |Cancelled
|- bgcolor="#bbbbbb"
| – || May 15 ||  || Carolina Stadium || colspan=7 |Cancelled
|- bgcolor="#bbbbbb"
| – || May 17 || LSU || Carolina Stadium || colspan=7 |Postponed
|- align="center" bgcolor="#ffbbb"
| 52 || May 18 || LSU || Carolina Stadium || 2-5 || Gausman (9-1) || Roth (5-1) || None || 7,914 || 38–14 || 17–10
|- bgcolor="#ccffcc"
| 53 || May 18 || LSU || Carolina Stadium || 5-4 || Webb (5-0) || Nola (6-4) || Price (9) || 8,242 || 39–14 || 18–10
|- align="center" bgcolor="#ffbbb"
| 54 || May 19 || LSU || Carolina Stadium || 2-310 || Cotton (6-0) || Beal (3-4) || Goody (10) || 8,242 || 39–15 || 18–11
|-

|-
! style="background:#73000A;color:white;"| Post-Season
|-

|- align="center" bgcolor="#ffbbb"
| 55 || May 23 ||  || Regions Park || 2-3 || Ziomek (5-6) || Webb (5-1) || Clinard (5) || 6,860 || 39–16 ||0–1
|- bgcolor="#ccffcc"
| 56 || May 24 ||  || Regions Park || 5-3 || Roth (6-1) || Luckie (2-2) || Price (10) ||  || 40–16 ||1–1
|- align="center" bgcolor="#ffbbb"
| 57 || May 25 || Florida || Regions Park || 2-7 || Johnson (7-4) || Holmes (6-1) || None || 9,067 || 40–17 ||1–2
|-

|- bgcolor="#ccffcc"
| 58 || June 1 || Manhattan || Carolina Stadium || 7-0 || Holmes (7-1) || Sewitt (11-2) || None || 7,043 || 41–17|| 1–0
|- bgcolor="#ccffcc"
| 59 || June 2 || Clemson || Carolina Stadium || 5-412 || Beal (4-4) || Brady (1-3) || None || 8,242 || 42–17|| 2–0
|- bgcolor="#ccffcc"
| 60 || June 3 || Clemson || Carolina Stadium || 4-3 || Montgomery (5-1) || Haselden (4-2) || Webb (3) || 8,242 || 43–17 || 3–0
|-

|- bgcolor="#ccffcc"
| 61 || June 9 || Oklahoma || Carolina Stadium || 5-0 || Roth (7-1) || John (8-8) || None || 8,242 || 44–17 || 4–0
|- bgcolor="#bbbbbb"
| - || June 10 || Oklahoma || Carolina Stadium || colspan=7 |Suspended
|- bgcolor="#ccffcc"
| 62 || June 11 || Oklahoma || Carolina Stadium || 5-1 || Webb (6-1) || Okert (9-8) || Price (11) || 8,242 || 45–17 || 5–0
|-

|- bgcolor="#ccffcc"
| 63 || June 16 || Florida || TD Ameritrade Park|| 7-3 || Roth (8-1) || Johnson (8-5) || Price (12) || 25,291 || 46–17 || 6–0
|- align="center" bgcolor="#ffbbb"
| 64 || June 18 || Arkansas || TD Ameritrade Park || 1-2 || Stanek (8-4) || Holmes (7-2) || Astin (11) || 23,537 || 46–18 || 6–1
|- bgcolor="#bbbbbb"
| - || June 20 || Kent State || TD Ameritrade Park || colspan=7 |Postponed
|- bgcolor="#ccffcc"
| 65 || June 21 || Kent State || TD Ameritrade Park || 4-1 || Roth (9-1) || Skulina (11-3) || None ||  || 47–18 || 7–1
|- bgcolor="#ccffcc"
| 66 || June 21 || Arkansas || TD Ameritrade Park || 2-0 || Montgomery (6-1) || Fant (2-3) || Price (13) || 23,593 || 48–18 || 8–1
|- bgcolor="#ccffcc"
| 67 || June 22 || Arkansas || TD Ameritrade Park || 3-2 || Price (5-4) || Suggs (7-1) || None || 22,184 || 49–18 || 9–1
|- align="center" bgcolor="#ffbbb"
| 68 || June 24 || Arizona|| TD Ameritrade Park || 1-5  || Wade (11-3) || Koumas (2-3) || None || 24,748 || 49–19 || 9–2
|- align="center" bgcolor="#ffbbb"
| 69 || June 25 || Arizona || TD Ameritrade Park || 1-4 || Troupe (6-1) || Price (5-5) || None || 23,872 || 49–20 || 9–3
|-

2012 South Carolina Gamecocks Baseball Schedule http://gamecocksonline.cstv.com/sports/m-basebl/sched/scar-m-basebl-sched.html

Honors and awards

 Michael Roth was named 2011-12 SEC H. Boyd McWhorter Male Scholar-Athlete Of The Year.
 Jordan Montgomery was named SEC Freshman of the Week on April 9.
 Grayson Greiner was named SEC Freshman of the Week on April 16.
 Michael Roth was named First-Team Capital One Academic All-American.
 Michael Roth was named SEC Baseball Scholar-Athlete of the Year.
 Christian Walker was named First Team All-SEC, Matt Price was named Second Team All-SEC, Tanner English, Grayson Greiner and Joey Pankake were named Freshman All-SEC, and Michael Roth and Evan Marzilli were named Defensive All-SEC.
 Adam Matthews was named MVP of the NCAA Columbia Regional. LB Dantzler, Colby Holmes, Jordan Montgomery, Joey Pankake and Chase Vergason were also named to the All-Tournament team.

Rankings

Gamecocks in the 2012 MLB Draft
The following members of the South Carolina Gamecocks baseball program were drafted in the 2012 Major League Baseball Draft.

References

South Carolina Gamecocks
South Carolina Gamecocks baseball seasons
College World Series seasons
South Carolina Gamecocks baseball
South Carolina